This is the discography for Norwegian avant-garde band Ulver.

Albums

Studio albums

Video albums

Live albums

Soundtracks

Collaboration albums

Cover albums

Compilation albums

Remix albums

Demos

Split albums

Tribute albums

Extended plays

Singles

Other appearances

References 

Discographies of Norwegian artists
Alternative rock discographies
Electronic music discographies
Heavy metal group discographies